The 1974 NCAA Men's Water Polo Championship was the sixth annual NCAA Men's Water Polo Championship to determine the national champion of NCAA men's college water polo. Tournament matches were played at the Belmont Plaza Pool in Long Beach, California during December 1974.

California defeated UC Irvine in the final, 7–6, to win their second national title. This was a rematch of the previous year's final, also won by California.

The leading scorer for the tournament was Jon Svendsen from California (9 goals). Doug Healy, also from California, was named the Most Outstanding Player. An All-Tournament Team, consisting of three players, was also named.

Qualification
Since there has only ever been one single national championship for water polo, all NCAA men's water polo programs (whether from Division I, Division II, or Division III) were eligible. A total of 8 teams were invited to contest this championship.

Bracket
Site: Belmont Plaza Pool, Long Beach, California

All-tournament team 
Doug Healy, California (Most outstanding player)
Mike Loughlin, California
Jon Svendsen, California

See also 
 NCAA Men's Water Polo Championship

References

NCAA Men's Water Polo Championship
NCAA Men's Water Polo Championship
1974 in sports in California
December 1974 sports events in the United States
1973